Piletocera albicinctata is a moth in the family Crambidae. It was described by George Hampson in 1897. It is found in the Bacan Islands of Indonesia and on the Shortland Islands of the Solomon Islands.

References

albicinctata
Moths described in 1897
Moths of Indonesia
Moths of Oceania